The Lozoya River is a  river flowing  near the centre of Spain. It originates at a high altitude in  the Sistema Central and cuts downward through steep rocks to flow into the Jarama River, a major tributary of the Tajo, the longest river on the Iberian Peninsula.

Water use

The Lozoya has been affected by the construction of several dams and reservoirs that supply almost 50 percent of the water for Madrid's metropolitan area. In fact, 50 percent  of the river's length is taken up by  reservoirs. Other uses of the river water such as forestry and agriculture have had much less physical impact. Because the impact of construction on the Lozoya has been so great, the river is now rated as Heavily Modified Water Body (HMWB) based on the European Synthesis Project.

See also 
 List of rivers of Spain
El Atazar Dam

Footnotes

External links
Hydric resources

Rivers of Spain
Tributaries of the Jarama